Simon Pleasance (born 1944) is an Anglo-French art translator and writer. He was educated at St. Edward’s School, then Keble College., Oxford.  He is a  longtime resident of southern Languedoc, France, and President of the environmental watchdog Observatoire des Paysages Audois. He has previously taught at the Istituto Britannico, Florence, 1966–1967 and worked   with Fay Stender’s [RIP] Prison Law Project, Oakland, California, 1971–1973

Publications

Original work
Pleasance, Simon, et al.  The Grimani Breviary: Reproduced from the Illuminated Manuscript Belonging to the Biblioteca Marciana, Venice. Translated from the Italian Breviario Grimani by Linda Packer. . Delray Beach, Fla: Levenger Press, 2007. 
Pleasance, Simon, and Fronza Woods., eds.  Portraits of Love: Great Romances of the 20th Century. New York: Filipacchi Pub, 2002.Originally published in France by Editions Filipacchi, Société Sonodip, Paris Match. 
Pleasance, Simon. Marc, Macke Und Delaunay The Beauty of a Fragile World (1910–1914) ; [on the Occasion of the Exhibition Marc, Macke and Delaunay - the Beauty of a Fragile World (1910–1914), Sprengel-Museum Hannover, 29. March - 19. July 2009]. Hannover: Sprengel-Museum, 2009. 
Pleasance, Simon, and Fronza Woods. Charming hotels around the world. Elle decor guide. New York, N.Y.: Filipacchi Pub, 2003. 
Pleasance, Simon. Claude Lévêque, Herr monde: exposition, [Thiers, le Creux de l'Enfer], 11 juin-17 septembre 2000. Thiers (Vallée des Usines, 63300): le Creux de l'enfer, 2000.

Numerous art and other  publications include studies on Christian Boltanski, Sophie Calle,  Jeff Koons, Annette Messager, Claude Monet, François Morellet, Aurélie Nemours, Fernando Pessoa, Erik Satie,  and Jean Tinguely;
scores of catalogues from Alberti and Albers via Calder,  Cocteau, Duchamp, Giacometti, the GRAV, Lichtenstein, Magritte, Miró, Smithson and Soutine to Wéry and Wines; collaborations with leading art critics and historians; and most recently  major monographs on Futurism
 (Rome, Paris, London), and Leonardo da Vinci (Chât. Clos Lucé, Amboise).

Translations
  France. Ministère de l'agriculture et de la pêche.  La forêt et les industries du bois 2006: données disponibles au 1er septembre 2005.:  Forests and the wood and timber industries 2006 : data available as of 1 February 2005  Paris: SCEES, 2006. French text and English translation by Simon Pleasance  (also earlier years,l 2000)
Guy Tosatto. Jörg Sasse: tableaux & esquisses ; [l'Exposition "Jörg Sasse, Tableaux & Esquisses" est présentée au Musée de Grenoble du 20 novembre 2004 au 24 janvier 2005]. München: Schirmer/Mosel, 2004.  Text in French, English (transl. Simon Pleasance and Fronza Woods), and German (transl.  Matthias Wolf) 
 Stéphane Calais: boxe thaï. Orléans: HYX, 2002. French text, and English translation by  Simon  Pleasance.

References

1944 births
Living people